Karl Nierendorf (18 April 1889 – 25 October 1947) was a German banker and later, art dealer. He was particularly known for championing the work of contemporary Expressionists in Cologne and Berlin before the War, especially Paul Klee, Otto Dix, and Vasily Kandinsky.

Karl Nierendorf was born on 18 April 1889.

He founded the publishing house Kairos Verlag, which produced the magazine Der Strom, and represented the work of Hans Hansen, and the drawings of Max Ernst and others.

Together with his younger brother, Josef Nierendorf (1898–1949), in 1920 they founded Nierendorf Köln Neue Kunst in Cologne. In 1921, he met Otto Dix in Dusseldorf, and in 1923, the brothers established the Galerie Nierendorf there. In 1923, Nierendorf took over J.B. Neumann's Berlin gallery, following Neumann's departure for New York, renaming it the Galeire Neumann-Nierendorf.

In 1937, Nierendorf moved to New York City, and established the Nierendorf Gallery there; and a subsidiary gallery, International Art, in Hollywood, the director of which was Estella Kellen (born Katzenellenbogen), sister of Konrad Kellen.

In 25 October 1947, he died suddenly from a heart attack. In 1948, the Guggenheim Museum purchased his entire estate for US$72,000, including more than 150 works of art by Paul Klee alone.

References

1889 births
1947 deaths
German bankers
German art dealers